Maulongo is a Gabonese village on the Ogooue River.

It is located in Haut-Ogooué near the Poubara Falls.

References

National Geographic.2003. African Adventure Atlas Pg 24,72. led by Sean Fraser

Populated places in Haut-Ogooué Province